The 1915 Newark Peppers season was a season in American baseball. After the 1914 season, the Indianapolis Hoosiers' remaining interest was purchased by Harry F. Sinclair and moved from Indianapolis, Indiana to Newark, New Jersey. The club also sold one of its top players, Benny Kauff, to the Brooklyn Tip-Tops to offset financial losses. After winning the Federal League championship the previous year, the Peppers dropped to fifth place. They finished 80–72, six games behind the Chicago Whales.

Regular season

Season standings

Record vs. opponents

Roster

Player stats

Batting

Starters by position 
Note: Pos = Position; G = Games played; AB = At bats; H = Hits; Avg. = Batting average; HR = Home runs; RBI = Runs batted in

Other batters 
Note: G = Games played; AB = At bats; H = Hits; Avg. = Batting average; HR = Home runs; RBI = Runs batted in

Pitching

Starting pitchers 
Note: G = Games pitched; IP = Innings pitched; W = Wins; L = Losses; ERA = Earned run average; SO = Strikeouts

Other pitchers 
Note: G = Games pitched; IP = Innings pitched; W = Wins; L = Losses; ERA = Earned run average; SO = Strikeouts

Relief pitchers 
Note: G = Games pitched; W = Wins; L = Losses; SV = Saves; ERA = Earned run average; SO = Strikeouts

References 
1915 Newark Pepper at Baseball Reference

Newark Peppers season
1915 in sports in New Jersey
Baseball in New Jersey